The Van Subregion (Turkish: Van Alt Bölgesi) (TRB2) is a statistical subregion in Turkey.

Provinces 

 Van Province (TRB21)
 Muş Province (TRB22)
 Bitlis Province (TRB23)
 Hakkâri Province (TRB24)

See also 

 NUTS of Turkey

External links 
 TURKSTAT

Sources 
 ESPON Database

Statistical subregions of Turkey